Nikolaj Duus Möller (born 20 July 2002) is a Swedish professional footballer who plays as a forward for Eerste Divisie side FC Den Bosch, on loan from English Premier League side Arsenal.

Club career
Born in Helsingborg, Sweden, Möller joined Malmö FF's youth academy at the age of 13. He joined Bologna's youth set-up in summer 2018 but returned to Malmö in January 2020.

On 6 October 2020, it was announced that Möller had joined Premier League club Arsenal on a four-year contract for a fee of around £450,000, with the player initially joining the club's Professional Development Phase. In July 2021, Möller joined Viktoria Köln in Germany's 3. Liga on a season-long loan. He made his senior debut on 31 July 2021, starting in a 1–1 league draw with FSV Zwickau.

On 3 January 2022, Arsenal exercised their option and recalled Moller early from his loan at Viktoria Koln. On 31 January, Arsenal announced they had loaned Moller to Eerste Divisie side FC Den Bosch for the remainder of the 2021–22 season. In July 2022 he returned to Den Bosch on a season-long loan.

International career
Möller has represented Sweden at under-18 level.

Career statistics

References

External links

2002 births
Living people
Swedish footballers
Sportspeople from Helsingborg
Association football forwards
Malmö FF players
Bologna F.C. 1909 players
Arsenal F.C. players
FC Viktoria Köln players
FC Den Bosch players
3. Liga players
Swedish expatriate footballers
Expatriate footballers in Italy
Expatriate footballers in England
Expatriate footballers in Germany
Expatriate footballers in the Netherlands
Swedish expatriate sportspeople in Italy
Swedish expatriate sportspeople in England
Swedish expatriate sportspeople in Germany
Swedish expatriate sportspeople in the Netherlands